Ellis Hall (22 June 1889 – 1949) was an English footballer who played for Hull City, Stoke, Huddersfield Town, Hamilton Academical and Halifax Town.

Career
Hall was born in Ecclesfield, Sheffield and began his career with Hull City making eight appearances in two years he left for Millwall Athletic and Hastings & St. Leonards United before joining Stoke in 1909. He played 45 times for the "Potters" in 1909–10 scoring four goals and left at the end of the season for Huddersfield Town. His career was interrupted by the outbreak of World War I during which time he also made guest appearances for a number of clubs including Sheffield United, Derby County and Grimsby Town. After the war Ellis went on to play for South Shields, Hamilton Academical and Halifax Town.

Three of his brothers, Ben, Harry and Fretwell, also played in the Football League.

Career statistics
Source:

References
Specific

General

1889 births
1949 deaths
English footballers
Footballers from Sheffield
Association football defenders
Association football wing halves
English Football League players
Scottish Football League players
Hull City A.F.C. players
Millwall F.C. players
Stoke City F.C. players
Huddersfield Town A.F.C. players
Sheffield United F.C. wartime guest players
Derby County F.C. wartime guest players
Grimsby Town F.C. players
South Shields F.C. (1889) players
Hamilton Academical F.C. players
Halifax Town A.F.C. players
Hastings & St Leonards United F.C. players